Pradeep Maharathy (4 July 1955 – 4 October 2020) was an Indian politician belonging to the Biju Janata Dal (BJD). At the time of his death, he was a member of the Odisha Legislative Assembly representing Pipili Constituency.

Personal background 
Pradeep Maharathy was born on 4 July 1955, in Pipili, Khorapada, Puri, the son of Gokulananda Maharathy.

Maharathy died of COVID-19 at a private hospital in Bhubaneswar during the COVID-19 pandemic in India. He was 65.

Political career
He started his political career as a student leader in SCS college, Puri. For the first time in 1985 he was elected as the MLA from Pipili Constituency, Odisha. He was then a member of Janata Party. He was elected to the legislature seven times.

In May 2011 Maharathy became Agriculture and Fisheries Minister in the Government of Odisha and served until 2012. He also served as Minister between 2014 and 2017. In 2017 he was named Minister of Panchayati Raj and Drinking Water.

Awards received 
Global Agriculture Leadership Award 2016

Krishi Karman Award 2014-15

References

1955 births
2020 deaths
Biju Janata Dal politicians
People from Puri district
Deaths from the COVID-19 pandemic in India
Janata Dal politicians
Janata Party politicians
Odisha MLAs 1985–1990
Odisha MLAs 1990–1995
Odisha MLAs 2000–2004
Odisha MLAs 2004–2009
Odisha MLAs 2009–2014
Odisha MLAs 2014–2019
Odisha MLAs 2019–2024
State cabinet ministers of Odisha